BCFP may refer to:

 British Columbia Forest Products, currently Catalyst Paper
 Bureau of Consumer Financial Protection (commonly the Consumer Financial Protection Bureau), an agency of the United States government